Matthew Warren Brown  (born July 28, 1989) is a former American football kick returner. He signed with the Tampa Bay Buccaneers as an undrafted free agent following the 2013 NFL Draft. He played college football for Temple. He also had brief stints with the Saskatchewan Roughriders of the Canadian Football League (CFL) and Tri-Cities Fever of the Indoor Football League (IFL). With the Roughriders, he won the 101st Grey Cup in 2013.

Early life and high school career
Brown was born and grew up in Baltimore, Maryland. His father, Warren Brown, is an attorney and his mother, Lynette, is a beautician. He played in the Northwood Little League (baseball) and the Northwood Youth football league and, despite his small stature, excelled at both.

Brown spent summers at Cushing Academy, a private boarding school in Massachusetts, with his sister Candice.

Brown initially attended Baltimore City College and the private Cardinal Gibbons in his hometown, but transferred to Peddie School, a private boarding school in New Jersey, the next year. He graduated from Peddie in 2008.

With no prospects for a college scholarship in football, Brown attended the Milford Academy in New Berlin, New York, where NFL starters LeSean McCoy and Shonn Greene had played. There, Brown set a school record with nine kickoff-return touchdowns in 12 games.

College career
Brown played college football for the Temple Owls, where he was a punt and kickoff return specialist, wide receiver and, for his first three years, back-up running back to Bernard Pierce. Because of his size, 5 foot, 5 inches tall, no Division I or II schools showed any interest in Brown; even at Temple he was a walk-on and played his first year without a scholarship. 
Brown returned 83 kick-offs for Temple for 2,068 yards and two touchdowns at 24.9 average yards per kick return. He also had 45 punt returns for 403 yards over the past two seasons.

Brown's best game at Temple came during his sophomore year against Army, when he carried the ball 28 times for 226 yards and 4 touchdowns.

2012
In his senior year, Brown was named the Big East Conference's special teams player of the year and was a 2012 All-Big East First-team player as a coaches' selection. Brown was also named to the 2012 ESPN.com All-Big East Team at return specialist, the 2012 CBSSports.com Big East All-Conference Team and the 2012 first-team All-Big East at kickoff returner by College Sports Madness.

Professional career

Tampa Bay Buccaneers
Brown attended both the Tampa Bay Buccaneers and the Kansas City Chiefs free agent camps in the spring of 2013, but did not hear back from either. Two weeks later, he was preparing to sign a contract with the Saskatchewan Roughriders of the Canadian Football League, but was denied entry to Canada due to an expired passport. He received a call from the Buccaneers shortly thereafter, and on May 28, 2013, he signed a three-year deal with the Buccaneers. Brown was released on July 23, 2013, after Peyton Hillis signed a one-year deal with the team.

Saskatchewan Roughriders
On August 5, 2013, Brown signed with the Roughriders. On November 24, 2013, the Roughriders defeated the Hamilton Tiger-Cats 45-23, to win the 101st Grey Cup. Brown lasted on the Roughriders roster until June 7, 2014, but was released without appearing in a game.

Arrest and criminal conviction
On Saint Patrick's Day, March 17, 2015, Brown was arrested on human trafficking and prostitution charges. His alleged victims were aged 14, 16, and 17. He pleaded guilty to a misdemeanor count of prostitution, and was sentenced to two years in prison in 2017.

References

External links
Saskatchewan Roughriders bio
Tampa Bay Buccaneers bio
Temple Owls bio

1989 births
Living people
Temple Owls football players
American football running backs
African-American players of American football
Players of American football from Baltimore
Tampa Bay Buccaneers players
Saskatchewan Roughriders players
Tri-Cities Fever players
Peddie School alumni
Milford Academy alumni
21st-century African-American sportspeople
20th-century African-American people